is a Japanese video game composer, arranger, and musician who has been employed at Square Enix since 1995. As a composer, he is best known for scoring Brave Fencer Musashi (1998), Final Fantasy VII: Advent Children (2005) and The Last Remnant (2008). He also plays the guitar in the rock bands The Black Mages and The Star Onions; both groups arrange and perform compositions from the Final Fantasy series.

Biography
Tsuyoshi Sekito was born in Osaka, Japan. His career as a video game composer began at the end of the 1980s when he joined Konami's sound team. The first game he scored was Space Manbow in 1989. The following year, he created the music for SD Snatcher and Metal Gear 2: Solid Snake along with several other composers. He was subsequently assigned to score the sports titles Double Dribble: 5-on-5 (1991) and Soccer Superstars (1995) and the cartoon adaptations Teenage Mutant Ninja Turtles II: Back from the Sewers (1991) and Tiny Toon Adventures: Buster's Hidden Treasure (1993), often as the leading composer. In 1994, he created the soundtrack to the arcade game Lethal Enforcers II: Gunfighters with Yuichi Sakakura. He left Konami in 1995 to join the Osaka branch of Square.

After joining Square, Sekito did not compose any games until 1998; his first assignment for the company was to create the music for Brave Fencer Musashi. In 1999, he assisted in scoring the soundtrack to Chocobo's Dungeon 2 by creating 12 pieces. His fellow composers were Kumi Tanioka and Kenji Ito. The following year, he composed music for the Japan-only All Star Pro-Wrestling along with Kenichiro Fukui and Tanioka. Sekito went solo for the game's sequel, All Star Pro-Wrestling II (2001), and was joined by Fukui again for the third and final installment, All Star Pro-Wrestling III (2003).

In 2002, after Sekito and Fukui's collaboration on All Star Pro-Wrestling, they decided to arrange some of the pieces in the Final Fantasy series, composed by Nobuo Uematsu. The two presented their arrangements to Uematsu who enjoyed their work. Although hesitant at first, Uematsu agreed to join Sekito and Fukui in forming the rock band The Black Mages; Sekito served as the group's guitarist. In 2003, Keiji Kawamori, Arata Hanyuda, and Michio Okamiya also joined the band. The Black Mages have released three studio albums, and have appeared at several concerts to promote their albums.

To create the music for The Last Remnant, Sekito utilized his guitar collection for different tracks and used different guitar sounds and techniques including detuning and delay effects on the album. Sekito did not use an orchestra for the game's music, but chose particular instruments and players to make the music an assortment of the best for each part.

In Kingdom Hearts 3D: Dream Drop Distance, Sekito felt unrestricted while composing music for the Nintendo 3DS, saying that he was able to create songs that would make a game player feel that were in a large world even on a small device due to the game console's 3D graphics.

For the game Final Fantasy Explorers, Sekito had to begin composing music with very few visual effects finished, and thus composed a wide variety of music to fit however it turned out.

Musical style and influences
Sekito cites heavy metal bands Van Halen and Dream Theater and film score composer Jerry Goldsmith as musical influences.

Works

Video games
Composition

Motocross Maniacs (1989) – with Michiru Yamane
Space Manbow (1989) – with Michiru Yamane and Yuji Takenouchi
SD Snatcher (1990) – with various others
Metal Gear 2: Solid Snake (1990) – with various others
Double Dribble: 5-on-5 (1991)
Teenage Mutant Ninja Turtles II: Back from the Sewers (1991) – with Yuko Kurahashi
Tiny Toon Adventures: Buster's Hidden Treasure (1993) – with Shinji Tasaka and Hideto Inoue
Lethal Enforcers II: Gunfighters (1994) – with Yuichi Sakakura
Soccer Superstars (1995)
Brave Fencer Musashi (1998)
Chocobo's Dungeon 2 (1998) – with Kumi Tanioka, Yasuhiro Kawakami, and Kenji Ito
Chrono Trigger (PlayStation) (1999)
All Star Pro-Wrestling (2000) – with Kenichiro Fukui and Kumi Tanioka
All Star Pro-Wrestling II (2001)
All Star Pro-Wrestling III (2003) – with Kenichiro Fukui
Romancing SaGa -Minstrel Song- (2005) – with Kenji Ito
Hanjuku Hero 4: 7-Jin no Hanjuku Hero (2005) – with various others
Dawn of Mana (2006) – with Kenji Ito, Masayoshi Soken and Ryuichi Sakamoto
The Last Remnant (2008) – with Yasuhiro Yamanaka
Gyromancer (2009)
Death by Cube (2009) – with Mud-J
Kingdom Hearts: Birth by Sleep (2010) – with Yoko Shimomura and Takeharu Ishimoto
The 3rd Birthday (2010) – with Yoko Shimomura and Mitsuto Suzuki
Fantasy Earth: Zero Chronicles OST (2011) – with Hidenori Iwasaki and Ryo Yamazaki
MindJack (2011)
Kingdom Hearts 3D: Dream Drop Distance (2012) – with Yoko Shimomura and Takeharu Ishimoto
Rise of Mana (2014) – with Kenji Ito, Hiroki Kikuta, and Yoko Shimomura
Final Fantasy Explorers (2014)
Kingdom Hearts III (2019) – with Yoko Shimomura and Takeharu Ishimoto
Final Fantasy VII Remake (2020) – with various others

Arrangement
Final Fantasy Chronicles (1999)
Final Fantasy Origins (2002)
Front Mission Online (2005)
Final Fantasy III (Nintendo DS) (2006) – with Keiji Kawamori
Dissidia: Final Fantasy (2008) – with Your Favorite Enemies and Mitsuto Suzuki
Dissidia 012 Final Fantasy (2011) – with Keiji Kawamori, Mitsuto Suzuki and Rieko Mikoshiba
Lord of Vermilion Re:2 (2011) - with Ryo Yamazaki, Mitsuto Suzuki, Yasuhiro Yamanaka and Keiji Kawamori
Dissidia Final Fantasy (2015) – with Takeharu Ishimoto and Keiji Kawamori
Secret of Mana (2018) – with various others

Films
Composition
Final Fantasy VII Advent Children (2005) – with Nobuo Uematsu and Keiji Kawamori

Arrangement
Final Fantasy VII Advent Children Complete (2009) – with Keiji Kawamori

Other works
feel/Go dream: Yuna & Tidus (2001) – with Masashi Hamauzu and Masayoshi Kikuchi
The Black Mages (2003)
The Black Mages II: The Skies Above (2005)
The Black Mages III: Darkness and Starlight (2008)

References

External links

1963 births
Japanese composers
Japanese hard rock musicians
Japanese male composers
Japanese music arrangers
Japanese rock guitarists
Konami people
Living people
Musicians from Osaka Prefecture
Progressive metal guitarists
Square Enix people
Video game composers